Voerså is a small fishing village located around 14 km south of Sæby, on the east coast of Vendsyssel, Denmark. It has a population of 532 (1 January 2022).

Voerså's scenic beaches attract some summer tourism to the village and its surrounding countryside.

References

Villages in Denmark
Frederikshavn Municipality